Jean (or Jehan) Fouquet (ca.1420–1481) was a French painter and miniaturist. A master of panel painting and manuscript illumination, and the apparent inventor of the portrait miniature, he is considered one of the most important painters from the period between the late Gothic and early Renaissance. He was the first French artist to travel to Italy and experience first-hand the early Italian Renaissance.

Little is known of Fouquet's early life and education. Though long assumed to have been an apprentice of the so-called Bedford Master of Paris it is now suggested that he may have studied under the Jouvenal Master in Nantes, whose works were formerly assumed to be early works by Fouquet. Sometime between 1445 and 1447 he travelled to Italy where he came under the influence of Roman Quattrocento artists such as Fra Angelico and Filarete. During the 1450s he began working at the French court, where he counted kings Charles VII and his successor Louis XI among his many patrons.

Life
He was born in Tours. Little is known of his life, but it is certain that he was in Italy before 1447, when he executed a portrait of Pope Eugene IV, who died that year. The portrait survives only in copies from much later.

Upon his return to France, while retaining his purely French sentiment, he grafted the elements of the Tuscan style, which he had acquired during his period in Italy, upon the style of the Van Eycks, forming the basis of early 15th-century French art and becoming the founder of an important new school.

He worked for the French court, including Charles VII, the treasurer Étienne Chevalier, and the chancellor Guillaume Jouvenel des Ursins. Near the end of his career, he became court painter to Louis XI.

His work can be associated with the French court's attempt to solidify French national identity in the wake of its long struggle with England in the Hundred Years' War.

One example is when Fouquet depicts Charles VII as one of the three magi. This is one of the very few portraits of the king. According to some sources, the other two magi are the Dauphin Louis, future Louis XI, and his brother.

Works

Fouquet's excellence as an illuminator, his precision in the rendering of the finest detail, and his power of clear characterization in work on this minute scale secured his eminent position in French art. His importance as a painter was demonstrated when his portraits and altarpieces were for the first time brought together from various parts of Europe for the exhibition of the "French Primitives" held at the Bibliothèque Nationale in Paris.

His self-portrait miniature would be the earliest sole self-portrait surviving in Western art, if the 1433 portrait by Jan van Eyck—usually called Portrait of a Man or Portrait of a Man in a Turban—is not in fact a self-portrait, as some art historians believe.

Far more numerous are his illuminated books and miniatures. The Musée Condé in Chantilly contains forty miniatures from the Hours of Étienne Chevalier, painted in 1461 for Chevalier. Fouquet also illuminated a copy of the Grandes Chroniques de France, for an unknown patron, thought to be either Charles VII or someone else at the royal court. Also from Fouquet's hand are eleven of the fourteen miniatures illustrating a translation of Josephus at the Bibliothèque Nationale. The second volume of this manuscript, unfortunately with only one of the original thirteen miniatures, was discovered and bought in 1903 by Henry Yates Thompson at a London sale, and restored by him to France.

One of Fouquet's most important paintings is the Melun Diptych (c. 1450), formerly in the Collegiate Church of Notre Dame, Melun. The left wing of the diptych depicts Étienne Chevalier with his patron saint St. Stephen, and is now in the Gemäldegalerie, Berlin. The right wing shows a pale Virgin and Child surrounded by red and blue angels and is now at the Royal Museum of Fine Arts, Antwerp. Since at least the seventeenth century, the Virgin has been recognized as a portrait of Agnès Sorel.

The Louvre has his oil portraits of Charles VII, of Count Wilczek, and of Guillaume Jouvenel des Ursins, and a portrait drawing in crayon.

The National Library of France has illuminated parchment manuscripts which recount the history of the Jewish people from Creation to the outbreak of the Jewish revolt against the Romans in A.D. 66.

Gallery

See also
Melun Diptych
Book of Hours of Simon de Varie

References

Notes

Citations

Sources

Further reading

External links

Encyclopædia Britannica
Bibliothèque nationale de France – Jean Fouquet, Painter and Illuminator of the XVth Century (smaller English version)
Bibliothèque nationale de France - Jean Fouquet, peintre et enlumineur du XVe siècle (full French version)
Fouquet's decorations for the Book of Hours of Simon de Varie Manuscript 74 G 37. Koninklijke Bibliotheek National Library of the Netherlands

1420 births
1481 deaths
15th-century French painters
Catholic painters
Court painters
French male painters
French Renaissance painters
French Roman Catholics
Manuscript illuminators
Artists from Tours, France
Portrait miniaturists